JOIX-DTV (channel 10), branded as , is the Kansai region flagship station of the Nippon News Network and the Nippon Television Network System, owned by the  subsidiary of the eponymous Yomiuri Shimbun Holdings, Japan's largest media conglomerate; Yomiuri TV forms part of Yomiuri's main television broadcasting arm alongside Kantō region flagship Nippon TV, which owns a 15.89% share in the company. Its studios are located in the Osaka Business Park district of Osaka.

History

Early years 
Nippon TV applied for TV broadcasting licenses in Osaka and Nagoya after it began broadcasting in 1953, but the Ministry of Post declined the application on the grounds that "Nippon TV is a Tokyo channel, and applying for licenses in other regions is an act of crossing the boundary." At the time, Osaka had only one privately owned television station, Osaka TV Broadcasting (later merged with Asahi Broadcasting). However, because the majority of its programming mostly came from KRT (now TBS), Nippon Television and its parent company, Yomiuri Shimbun Group, began to try to establish their own television station in Osaka. Yomiuri Shimbun filed for a broadcasting license as Shin-Osaka TV in November 1956. In addition to Yomiuri Shimbun, eight other newspapers, including those from Asahi, Mainichi, Sankei, Kobe, and Kyoto, applied for TV broadcasting licenses in the Kansai region at the time, and only two licenses were issued, indicating that rivalry was fierce.

To ease the overheated competition, the Ministry of Post decided to grant an additional broadcasting license in the Osaka area, and on October 22, 1957, the new Osaka TV station was granted a broadcasting license. On August 1, 1958, Shin-Osaka TV changed its name to Yomiuri TV.

1958–1985 
At 9:00 a.m. on August 28, 1958, Yomiuri TV was launched as the second privately owned television station in Osaka. Since Yomiuri TV is licensed as a quasi-educational station, they are required to dedicate 20%-30% of its airtime to educational programming, which resulted in being the only broadcaster at that time to air educational programs the most. At that time, Yomiuri TV produced "The Tales of Genji" which received positive reviews. Yomiuri TV started broadcasting color TV programming in September 1960, making it the first TV station in the Kansai region to do so. In April 1968, 30% of daytime and 45% of evening programs were broadcast in color. When Yomiuri TV renewed its broadcast license in 1965, the license category was changed from quasi-educational to general programming, which meant that a greater percentage of entertainment programming could be broadcast. In Spring of 1970, 100% of Yomiuri TV's programming were broadcast in color.

Yomiuri TV's ratings gradually rose after the 1970s, and by the third week of November 1973, Yomiuri TV's daily average rating had reached 10%, and its prime time rating had reached 18.2%, making it the top-rated station in Osaka, including NHK.

Broadcasting
The station broadcasts on digital channel 14 in most regions. The channel ceased analog broadcasting on July 24, 2011.

Offices
Headquarters: 3-50, Shiromi Icchome, Chūō-ku, Osaka, Japan (relocated on September 1, 2019)
Tokyo Branch Office: 20th floor, NTV Tower, 6-1, Higashi-Shimbashi Itchome, Minato, Tokyo, Japan
Nagoya Branch Office: 3rd floor, Shin-Kyoei Building, 7-9, Sakae Sanchome, Naka-ku, Nagoya, Japan
Kyoto Branch Office: 5th floor, Yomiuri Kyoto Building, Shishikannon-cho, Karasuma-dori Rokkaku-Sagaru, Nakagyo-ku, Kyoto, Japan
Kobe Branch Office: 4th floor, Yomiuri Kobe Building, 2-10, Sakaemachi-dori Itchome, Chūō-ku, Kobe, Japan
Paris Branch Office: NNN Paris, Tour Maine Montparnasse, 33 Avenue De Maine, Paris, France
Shanghai Branch Office: 580 Nanjing West Road 902B, Subsidiary Building of Nan Zheng Building, Shanghai, China
New York Branch Office: NNN New York, 645 5th Avenue Suite 303, New York, NY, United States

See also
 Nippon TV
 Television in Japan

References

External links
Yomiuri Telecasting Corporation corporate website 
Official website of ytv 
 

Television stations in Japan
Companies based in Osaka Prefecture
Nippon News Network
Television channels and stations established in 1958
Mass media in Osaka
1958 establishments in Japan
Anime companies